Benjamín Nicolás Rivera Silva (born 23 October 1999) is a Chilean footballer who plays for Deportes Temuco.

References

1999 births
Living people
Chilean footballers
Chilean Primera División players
Primera B de Chile players
Everton de Viña del Mar footballers
Deportes Iquique footballers
Deportes Temuco footballers
Association football midfielders